Nines may refer to:
 Nines, Albania, a village in Fier County
  describes terms like "five nines" in engineering, including:
 High availability of systems, which also has a chart
 Nine (purity), with respect to materials
 Nines (film), a film
 Nines (golf), a game that can be played in golf
 Nines (rugby), a variant of rugby league football
 Nines (rapper) (born 1990), English musician
 The Nines (band), a power pop band led by Steve Eggers from Toronto, Canada
 The Nines (2007), psychological thriller and drama, written and directed by John August
 The Nines (hotel), luxury hotel in Portland, Oregon, United States
 Networked Infrastructure for Nineteenth-century Electronic Scholarship (NINES), scholarly initiative supported by Applied Research in Patacriticism
 Cambridge '99 Rowing Club
 YoRHa No. 9 Type S, nicknamed "Nines", a character from the video game Nier: Automata

See also 
 9 (disambiguation)
 9s (disambiguation)